Suiyang County is a county in Guizhou Province, China. It is under the jurisdiction of the prefecture-level city of Zunyi. It has an area of 2,566 square kilometers and a population of 560,000 as of 2017.

Suiyang leaf-litter toad, Leptobrachella suiyangensis, is only known from the Huoqiuba Nature Reserve in Suiyang County.

Climate

References

External links
Official website of Suiyang County government

County-level divisions of Guizhou
Zunyi